Southern Tomb 11 is an ancient sepulchre located at Amarna, Egypt. It was used for the burial of Ramose (General), whose titles included, "Royal scribe, Commander of troops of the Lord of the Two Lands, Steward of Nebmaatra (Amenhotep III)".

It is unknown whether he was the same person as the Vizier Ramose whose Theban tomb is TT55, but it seems unlikely because they have different titles and the names of their wives do not agree.

The tomb is small and the main body is undecorated. The entrance doorway shows Ramose being rewarded by the 18th Dynasty Pharaoh Akhenaten, together with scenes showing Nefertiti and Meritaten. In the shrine a double statue showing Ramose and his sister Nebetiunet was carved out of the rock, then plastered.

References

External links
 Amarna Project: The South Tombs (PDF)

Amarna tombs